Giulio Quaglio the Younger (1668–1751) was an Italian Baroque painter. He was part of the large Quaglio pedigree of Italian artists involved in architecture, indoor fresco decoration, and scenography (stage design) for the court theaters. He was born and died in Laino, a mountain village at Como. Giulio II was involved in fresco decoration in Friuli, including for the chapel of Monte di Pietà at Udine. His most highly valued work is the painting of Saint Nicholas' Cathedral in Ljubljana. He also painted the central hall of Meerscheinschlössl in Graz. He had two sons, Domenico and Giovanni Maria Quaglio.

Gallery

References

External links

17th-century Italian painters
Italian male painters
18th-century Italian painters
Painters from Lombardy
Italian Baroque painters
1668 births
1751 deaths
18th-century Italian male artists